Safarovo (Safar) is a rural locality (a selo) and the administrative centre of Safarovsky Selsoviet, Chishminsky District, Bashkortostan, Russia. The population was 991 as of 2010. There are 19 streets.

Geography 
Safarovo is located 14 km southwest of Chishmy (the district's administrative centre) by road. Karamaly is the nearest rural locality.

References 

Rural localities in Chishminsky District